Nebojša Bogavac (born December 14, 1973) is a Montenegrin professional basketball coach and former player who is the current head coach for Podgorica of the Prva A Liga and the ABA League Second Division..

Professional career
Bogavac played four seasons for KK Lovćen in the Yugoslav Basketball League from 1997 to 2001. He then spent next four years with KK Hemofarm between 2001 and 2005. He helped the team to win the Adriatic League title in 2005. Bogavac signed with CB Breogán in Spain for the 2005–05 season. After that, he played two years with Le Mans Sarthe Basket in France. He started the 2008–09 season with KK Lovćen, but left in December for Mahram Tehran BC, for which he played only at the tournament in Dubai later that month. In February 2009, he signed with ASVEL Basket for the rest of the season. In the 2009–10 season, Bogavac represented KK Gorštak and JDA Dijon Basket. In October 2010, he returned to ASVEL, and played there until December.

National team career
Bogavac was a member of the Serbia and Montenegro national team at the EuroBasket 2003 in Sweden. Over four tournament games, he averaged 1.8 points, one rebound, and 0.5 assists per game.

Bogavac was a member of the Montenegro national team at the FIBA EuroBasket 2009 Division B.

Coaching career 
On 18 June 2021, Podgorica hired Bogavac as their new head coach.

Personal life 
His son, Luka (born 2003), is a professional basketball player, playing for Mega Basket.

References

External links
 Nebojša Bogavac at ACB.com
 Nebojša Bogavac at Euroleague.net

1973 births
Living people
ABA League players
ASVEL Basket players
CB Breogán players
JDA Dijon Basket players
KK Hemofarm players
KK Hemofarm coaches
KK Lovćen players
KK Podgorica coaches
Le Mans Sarthe Basket players
Liga ACB players
Mahram Tehran BC players
Montenegrin basketball coaches
Montenegrin expatriate basketball people in France
Montenegrin expatriate basketball people in Iran
Montenegrin expatriate basketball people in Serbia
Montenegrin expatriate basketball people in Spain
Montenegrin men's basketball players
People from Mojkovac
Shooting guards
Small forwards